Old Believers Pokrovsky Cathedral ― a cathedral of the Don and Caucasian Diocese of the Russian Orthodox Old-Rite Church, located in Rostov-on-Don (Ulyanovskaya Street, 37). It was built in 1913 on the project of architect V.A. Pokrovsky. The cathedral has the status of an object of cultural heritage of regional significance.

History 
One of the first places of worship for Old Believers community of Rostov-on-Don was a small chapel. In 1813, a wooden Church of the Intercession was built on the site of the chapel. According to the assumption of the Rostov regional ethnographer A.P. Zimin, this church was moved by the settlers from the White Sea.

In 1913, a stone church of the Intercession of the Holy Virgin was built on the opposite side of the street where the wooden church was situated. The construction of the temple was donated Rostov merchant N.A. Panin. A well-known architect Vladimir Pokrovsky was the author of the project.

Opposite the church apse there was located Old Believers hospice (according to other sources, it actually was the clergy house), built in 1910 also on the funds of Panin. In church was established an altar of St. Elijah the Prophet, so the temple also sometimes called "Pokrov―St. Elijah Church".

The proximity of the two Old Believers Pokrovsky temple was explained by the presence of multiple branches of Russian Old Believers. According to the memoirs of the members of congregation, stone Church of the Intercession was originally owned by the Beglopopovtsy of Russian Old-Orthodox Church. And to the community of Russian Orthodox Old-Rite Church belonged the old wooden church. In 1923, the wooden church was closed, and its congregation moved into the stone Pokrovsky temple. In 1930 this temple was closed, too, and its building was used to house a radio workshop. In 1946 it was re-opened, but was given to Russian Orthodox Old-Rite Church community.

Architecture 
Old Believers Pokrovsky Cathedral was built in Russian Revival style. The architect had to solve the problem of construction of the temple in a small area surrounded by urban development. This fact explains its unusual architecture.

To extended dining room adjoins the semicircular apse, asymmetrically located one-tier belfry and porch. Belfry, refectory and the apse are crowned by small cupolas with crosses. Semicircular window openings of the refectory are decorated with decorative plaster. The temple is designed to hold about 500 worshipers.

Gallery

References

External links 
 Official site of the cathedral

Churches in Rostov-on-Don
Cultural heritage monuments in Rostov-on-Don
Churches completed in 1913
Old Believer movement
Cultural heritage monuments of regional significance in Rostov Oblast